Long-form journalism is a branch of journalism dedicated to longer articles with larger amounts of content.  Typically, this will be between 1,000 and 20,000 words. Long-form articles often take the form of creative nonfiction or narrative journalism.

History

Middle Ages 

The distribution of tracts pre-dates the development of the printing press, with the term being applied by scholars to religious and political works at least as early as the 13th century. They were used to disseminate the teachings of John Wycliffe in the 14th century. As a political tool, tracts proliferated throughout Europe during the 17th century. They were printed as persuasive religious material from the time of Gutenberg's invention.

Renaissance 

A treatise is a formal and systematic written discourse on some subject, generally longer and treating it in greater depth than an essay, and more concerned with investigating or exposing the principles of the subject. Some noteworthy Treatises include The Prince, The Wealth of Nations, A Treatise of Human Nature and Two Treatises of Government.

Early modern Europe 

Beginning with propaganda during the Reformation, the rise of the printing press and literacy led to pamphleteering enjoying its heyday from the 17th Century to the 19th Century. Books were considered expensive and tracts did not necessarily address contemporary issues so pamphlets were widely produced and circulated.
UNESCO defined a pamphlet as " a non-periodical printed publication of at least 5 but not more than 48 pages, exclusive of the cover pages, published in a particular country and made available to the public" and a book as "a non-periodical printed publication of at least 49 pages, exclusive of the cover pages". A notable pamphlet is Common Sense.

20th century

Literary and cultural-commentary publications such as Reader's Digest, The Atlantic, and Harper's pioneered long-form journalism in the new medium of magazines.

21st century
Long-form journalism has grown in popularity over the past several years, with blogs and media organizations including Medium, The Caravan, BuzzFeed and The New York Times creating or expanding long-form coverage and new companies such as The Atavist, Longreads.com, Longform.org, and Longformarticles.net being founded to capitalize on the new interest.

See also
Treatise
Tract

References

Further reading

Journalism